Parinaud's oculoglandular syndrome is the combination of granulomatous conjunctivitis in one eye, and swollen lymph nodes in front of the ear on the same side. Most cases are caused by cat-scratch disease, although it is an unusual feature of this condition. Occasionally it may be caused by other infections.

It should not be confused with the neurological syndrome caused by a lesion in the midbrain which is also known as Parinaud's syndrome. Both were named after the same person, Henri Parinaud.

Causes
 Bartonella henselae
 Francisella tularensis
 herpes simplex virus type 1
 Paracoccidioides brasiliensis

Diagnosis

References

External links 

Infectious diseases
Herpes simplex virus–associated diseases
Syndromes caused by microbes